Herrmann Zschoche (born 25 November 1934) is a German film director and screenwriter. He has directed 25 films between 1961 and 1994. His 1981 film Bürgschaft für ein Jahr was entered into the 32nd Berlin International Film Festival.

Filmography

Film
  (1961)
  (1962)
  (1964)
 Engel im Fegefeuer (1964)
  (1965, released: 1990)
 Leben zu zweit (1968)
 Weite Straßen – stille Liebe (1969)
 Eolomea (1972)
  (1974)
  (1976)
  (1977, released: 1979)
  (1978)
  (1980)
  (1980)
 Bürgschaft für ein Jahr (1981)
  (1983)
  (1985)
  (1987)
  (1989)
  (1991)

Television
 Drei Damen vom Grill (1991, TV series, 14 episodes)
 Hier und Jetzt: Erste Begegnung (1992, TV series episode)
 Geschichten aus der Heimat (1993, TV series, 1 episode)
 Wo das Herz zu Hause ist (1994)
  (1994)
 Tatort: Tödliche Freundschaft (1995, TV series episode)
 Inspector Rex: Masked Death (1995, TV series episode)
  (1996–1997, TV series, 11 episodes)

References

External links

1934 births
Living people
Film people from Dresden
Recipients of the National Prize of East Germany
Mass media people from Saxony